is Miho Komatsu's 14th single released under the Giza Studio label. It was released 8 August 2001. The single reached #30 rank in its first week and sold 11,810 copies. It charted for two weeks and in total sold 15,360 copies.

Track list
All songs are written and composed by Miho Komatsu and arranged by Yoshinobu Ohga

re-arranged version of Miho Komatsu's 2nd single Kagayakeru Hoshi
 (instrumental)
 (instrumental)

References 

2001 songs
2001 singles
Miho Komatsu songs
Songs written by Miho Komatsu
Giza Studio singles
Being Inc. singles
Song recordings produced by Daiko Nagato